The LGV Rhône-Alpes (French: Ligne à Grande Vitesse; English: high-speed line) is a  French high-speed rail line situated in the Auvergne-Rhône-Alpes region which extends the LGV Sud-Est southwards. Opened to service in 1994, the line bypasses the built-up Lyon area towards the east; in addition it serves Lyon-Saint-Exupéry TGV station (known until June 2000 as Satolas TGV station). Beyond Valence TGV station the line is continued by the LGV Méditerranée. LGVs Rhône-Alpes, Sud-Est and Méditerranée, when completed, received their official nickname, the City To Coast (C2C) Highway ("Ville à la Mer").

The line was constructed in two sections, north and south. The first section was opened in time for the 1992 Winter Olympics in Albertville.

Route
The line crosses four departments from north to south: Ain, Rhône, Isère and Drôme.

The line is connected to the regular network by links at Saint-Quentin-Fallavier, enabling links to Savoie, Isère and Italy via Chambéry and Modane.

Line specifics

The line includes 10 large viaducts (total length ), and 4 tunnels (total length ).

A command post named CCT (Commande centralisée des trains - Central Train Command) enables the continual monitoring of trains running on the entire line and to remotely control security installations. It is situated in Lyon, in an SNCF building near the gare de Perrache.

Stations
The line comprises one new station:
Gare de Lyon Saint-Exupéry, situated in the commune of Colombier-Saugnieu. This station, with its striking architecture, is the work of the Spanish architect Santiago Calatrava. It serves the Lyon–Saint-Exupéry Airport.

History
 28 October 1989: declaration of public utility
 13 December 1992: service begins on 42 km first section between Montanay and Saint-Quentin-Fallavier
 3 July 1994: service begins on 73 km second section between Saint-Quentin-Fallavier and Saint-Marcel-lès-Valence
 3 July 1994: inauguration of Gare de Lyon-Saint-Exupéry TGV
 7 June 2001: inauguration of LGV Méditerranée extending this line southwards

See also
 High-speed rail in France

References

Rhone-Alpes
Railway lines opened in 1994